Emanuela Galliussi (born in Udine, Italy) is an actress in Italian cinema.

Emanuela attended the drama school Accademia Nazionale D'Arte Drammatica Silvio D'Amico.

Filmography
 Going Bongo
 #Screamers

References

Living people
Italian film actresses
Year of birth missing (living people)
People from Brooklyn
People from Udine
Accademia Nazionale di Arte Drammatica Silvio D'Amico alumni